Steniolia scolopacea is a species of sand wasp in the family Crabronidae. It is found in Central America and North America.

Subspecies
 Steniolia scolopacea albicantia J. Parker, 1917
 Steniolia scolopacea scolopacea Handlirsch, 1889

References

Further reading

 
 
 

Crabronidae
Insects described in 1889